Desert Noises are an American indie rock band from the Provo, Utah area.

History
Desert Noises was formed in 2009 by brothers Kyle and Trevor Henderson in Provo, Utah, the third largest city in the state. They released two EPs under Northplatte Records before a change of the lineup in 2011. 
With newly solidified lineup of Tyler Osmond, Patrick Boyer and Brennan Allen, Desert Noises began touring extensively playing notable music festivals such as Austin City Limits Music Festival and LouFest as well as releasing another EP in 2012. In 2013 the band signed with the SQE Music label to record their Debut LP 27 Ways. which was released on March 25, 2014 and produced by Nic Jodoin.
The band's influences, according to their website, include "beat-oriented soul and R&B as well as classic psychedelic rock".

On May 7, 2015, the band announced on its Facebook page its decision to move from Provo to Nashville, Tennessee.

Members

Current
 Kyle Henderson- Lead Vocals/Guitar
 Tyler Osmond- Bassist/harmonic vocals
 Patrick Boyer- Lead Guitar
 Brennan Allen- Drums

Discography

Albums
 Mountain Sea (2011)
 27 Ways (2014)

EPs
 Desert Noises (2009)
 I Wont See You (2012)

References

External links 

Indie rock musical groups from Utah
Musical groups established in 2009
2009 establishments in Utah